The Albergoni family was part of the nobility of Italy from Lombardy. 

Their coat of arms was blue in the shield, featuring a golden lion and three stars above.

References 

Italian noble families